Daelen Fynn (born 25 October 1999) is a South African cricketer. He made his List A debut on 1 March 2021, for KwaZulu-Natal in the 2020–21 CSA Provincial One-Day Challenge, taking a five-wicket haul. He made his first-class debut on 4 March 2021, for KwaZulu-Natal in the 2020–21 CSA 3-Day Provincial Cup.

References

External links
 

1999 births
Living people
South African cricketers
KwaZulu-Natal cricketers
Place of birth missing (living people)